Callao is a station on Line D of the Buenos Aires Underground. The station was opened on 23 February 1940 as part of the extension of Line D from Tribunales to Palermo.

It is located at the intersection of avenues Córdoba and Callao.

References

External links

Buenos Aires Underground stations
Balvanera
1940 establishments in Argentina